Zsuzsanna Emese Mokcsay (born 1940) is an American writer, activist, playwright and songwriter living in America who writes about feminist spirituality and Dianic Wicca under the pen name Zsuzsanna Budapest or Z. Budapest. She is the founder of the Susan B. Anthony Coven #1, which was founded in 1971 as the first women-only witches' coven. She founded the female-only type of Dianic Wicca.

She is the founder and director of the Women's Spirituality Forum, a nonprofit organization featuring lectures, retreats and other events, and was the lead of a cable TV show called 13th Heaven. She had an online autobiography entitled Fly by Night, and wrote for the religion section of the San Francisco Examiner on subjects related to Pagan religions. Her play The Rise of the Fates premiered in Los Angeles in the mid-seventies. She is the composer of several songs including "We All Come From the Goddess".

Early life and education
Z. Budapest was born in Budapest, Hungary. Her mother, Masika Szilagyi, was a medium, a practicing witch, and a professional sculptress whose work reflected themes of Goddess and nature spirituality. In 1956, when the Hungarian Revolution began, she fled to Austria as a political refugee. She finished high school in Innsbruck, graduated from a bilingual gymnasium, and won a scholarship to the University of Vienna where she studied languages.

Budapest emigrated to the United States in 1959, where she studied at the University of Chicago, with groundbreaking originator of the art of improvisation, Viola Spolin, and the improvisational theater group The Second City. She married and had two sons, Laszlo and Gabor, but later divorced. She realized she is a lesbian and chose, in her words, to avoid the "duality" between man and woman.

Career
Budapest's first job in television was as a Color Girl for the CBS Network in New York, assigned to The Ed Sullivan Show.

Activism

Budapest moved to Los Angeles from New York City in 1970, and became an activist in the women's liberation movement. She was on the staff of the first Women's Center in the U.S. there for many years, and became the Founder and High Priestess of Susan B. Anthony Coven #1, the first women-only witches' coven, which was founded in 1971. She was responsible for the creation of an Anti-Rape Squad and the Take Back the Night Movement in Southern California, and facilitated many of their street marches.

Fortune telling and arrest
In 1975, she was arrested for "fortune telling" at her candle and book store in Venice, California following a "sting" by an undercover police woman Rosalie Kimberlin, who received a tarot reading from her. Subsequently, Budapest was charged with violating a municipal by-law, Code 43.30, which made fortune telling unlawful. Budapest and her defense team described her as "the first witch prosecuted since Salem," and the ensuing trial became a focus for media and pagan protesters. Budapest was found guilty.

Duly, Budapest and her legal counsel set out to establish Wicca, and more specifically Dianic Wicca, as a bona fide religion. The state's Supreme Court reversed the guilty verdict as unconstitutional and in violation of the Freedom of Religion Act.

Following her conviction, she engaged in nine years of appeals on the grounds that reading the Tarot was an example of women spiritually counselling women within the context of their religion. With pro bono legal representation she was acquitted, and the laws against "fortune telling" were struck from California law.

Later career
In the eighties, she created the TV show 13th Heaven, which ran on syndicated cable in the San Francisco Bay area for seven years.

Criticism for transphobia 
Z Budapest is considered by many in the Neopagan community to be transphobic. In February 2011, she conducted a ritual with the Circle of Cerridwen at PantheaCon for "genetic women only" from which she barred trans women as well men. This caused a backlash that led many to criticize Dianic Wicca as an inherently transphobic lesbian-separatist movement. The Los Angeles Times wrote that:

Works

Books

With Diana Paxson

Plays
The Rise of the Fates: A Woman's Passion Play, 1976.

Films
  Released on VHS by Sony/Columbia-Tristar on August 5, 1992.

See also 
 Goddess movement
 Transfeminism

References

Works cited

Further reading

External links
Z. Budapest's Personal Website
Famous Witches - Zsuzsanna Budapest (1940 –)

1940 births
Living people
20th-century pseudonymous writers
21st-century American women
Activists from Oakland, California
American feminist writers
American occultists
American spiritual writers
American Wiccans
American women non-fiction writers
Dianic Wicca
Feminism and transgender
Feminist spirituality
Founders of modern pagan movements
Hungarian emigrants to the United States
Lesbian feminists
Lesbian writers
LGBT Wiccans
Pseudonymous women writers
Wiccan feminists
Wiccan priestesses